Le Chant du monde is a 1965 Italian film directed by Marcel Camus. It is based on the novel The Song of the World (Fr. Le Chant du monde, 1934) by French author Jean Giono.

References

External links
 

1965 films
Films based on works by Jean Giono
Films directed by Marcel Camus
Films about feuds
Films set in France
Films set in the Alps
French drama films
1960s French-language films
Italian drama films
1960s Italian films
1960s French films